Evanston Township High School (ETHS), is a public four-year high school located in Evanston, Illinois, a North Shore suburb of Chicago, in the United States. It is part of Evanston Township High School District 202.

Notable alumni of Evanston Township High School include:

Business
 Henry Engelhardt, CEO of the Admiral Group
 Lester Crown, businessman
 Bob Galvin (1940) was the CEO of Motorola (1959–86).
 Toby S. Wilt. (1960) Businessman and golfer. Member of Athletic Hall of Fame 1960 football team.

Film, television, and theatre
Alan Bovik (1976) is a two-time Emmy Award winning television engineer, vision scientist and Professor at The University of Texas at Austin.
 Heather Burns (1993) is an actress who appeared in films such as Miss Congeniality, Two Weeks Notice, and You've Got Mail.
 Joan Cusack (1980) is a two-time Academy Award-nominated actress (Working Girl and In & Out) also known for such films as Addams Family Values, Broadcast News, School of Rock, Toys and Toy Story 2.
 John Cusack (1984) is a Golden Globe Award-nominated actor (High Fidelity), also known for such films as Being John Malkovich, Con Air, Eight Men Out, The Grifters and Midnight in the Garden of Good and Evil.
 Jules Engel (1957) was an animator whose work includes Popeye the Sailor, and the Walt Disney films Fantasia and Bambi.
 Karen Finley (1974) is an artist, actress, educator and performer, whose art is displayed in museums around the world.
 Zach Gilford (2000) is an actor, best known for his role on the television series Friday Night Lights.
 Jason Goff (2000) is a television and radio host, best known for hosting Chicago Bulls Pregame/Postgame Live on NBC Sports Chicago.
 Alicia Goranson (1992) is an actress, best known for her role as Becky Conner on the television series Roseanne.
Laura Harrier (2008) is an actress, best known for her role as Liz in Spider-Man: Homecoming.
 Anders Holm (1999) is an actor and writer, best known for his role Anders "Ders" Holmvik on the television series Workaholics.
 Cassidy Hubbarth (2003) is a sports anchor for ESPN.
 Claudia Jennings (1968) was an actress known as the "Queen of B movies" and also Playboy Playmate of the Month for November 1969 and Playmate of the Year for 1970.
 Amanda Jones (1968) was crowned Miss USA 1973.
 Lauren Lapkus (2004) is an actress and comedian, best known for her role as Susan Fischer in the Netflix original series Orange Is the New Black.
 Jeffrey Lieber (1987) is a writer who is co-creator of the television series Lost.
 Michael Madsen (1976) is an actor best known for roles in films such as Reservoir Dogs and Kill Bill.
 Todd McCarthy (1968) is a film critic who has worked with Variety and The Hollywood Reporter.
 Lynne Moody (1963) is an actress.
 Jessie Mueller (2001) is a Tony Award-winning and a two-time Drama Desk-nominated theatre actress best known for roles in Broadway musicals such as Melinda Wells in On A Clear Day You Can See Forever, Janet Conover/Helena Landless in The Mystery Of Edwin Drood, and Billie Bendix in Nice Work If You Can Get It.
 Ajay Naidu (1990) is an actor who has appeared in films such as Pi, Office Space, and the television series LateLine.
 Tom Neal (1932), was a stage, film and television actor and amateur boxer.
 Steve Pink (1984) is a director, screenwriter, and producer who has worked on films such as High Fidelity, Grosse Point Blank, and Hot Tub Time Machine.
 Jeremy Piven (1983) is an actor, best known for his roles as Ari Gold on the television series Entourage and as Harry Gordon Selfridge on the series Mr. Selfridge.
 Jeffrey Sweet (1967) is a member of the playwrights ensemble of the Victory Gardens Theater of Chicago, a member of the Council of the Dramatists Guild, and the author of an oral history of Second City called Something Wonderful Right Away.
Sophie Thatcher (2019) is an American stage and television actress best known for her role in the Showtime original drama Yellowjackets.
 Dave VanDam (1973)  American voice impressionist.
 Lena Waithe (2002) is a television writer, producer, and actress, currently playing Denise on the Netflix series Master of None
 Ruby Wax (1969) is an actress, comedian, and writer.
 Jenniffer Weigel (1988) is a Chicago television and radio personality.
 Rafer Weigel (1987) is a St. Louis television news anchor and former Chicago sportscaster.

Government and public service
 George Wildman Ball (1926) was U.S. Under Secretary of State under Presidents Kennedy and Johnson.  He was briefly United States Ambassador to the United Nations under President Lyndon B. Johnson.
 Jason Carter was a Georgia state senator and the 2014 Democratic nominee for governor of Georgia.
 David E. Miller (1980) was elected five times as an Illinois state representative and was the 2010 Democratic nominee for Illinois comptroller.
 Sue Mullins was an Iowa farmer and state legislator.
 John Edward Porter (1953) was a United States Congressman representing Illinois's 10th congressional district (1980–2001).

Letters
 Jessica Abel (1987) is a comic book writer and artist.
 James Atlas (1967) is the president of Atlas & Company, publishers, and founding editor of the Penguin Lives Series.
 David Epstein (1998) author and investigative reporter at ProPublica.
 Cornelia Grumman (1981) is a 2003 Pulitzer Prize–winning editorial writer.
 Charles R. Johnson (1966) is an author.  His novel Middle Passage won the 1990 National Book Award.
 Margaret Landon (1921) is an author whose book Anna and the King of Siam was adapted into the stage musical and film The King and I.
 Audrey Niffenegger (1980) is an artist and author of The Time Traveller's Wife.
 Jack N. Rakove (1964) received the 1997 Pulitzer Prize in History for the book Original Meanings: Politics and Ideas in the Making of the Constitution.
 Megan Twohey (1994) is an investigative reporter with The New York Times who published an investigation in 2017 detailing the sexual abuse allegations made against Harvey Weinstein.

Music
 David Burge (1947) is a composer, author, and pianist who works with contemporary music.
Bob Cranshaw is a jazz bass player.
 Kay Davis is a jazz singer.
 Alexander Frey is an internationally renowned conductor, pianist, organist and recording artist.
 Ezra Furman (2004) is the lead singer of the rock/folk band "Ezra Furman and the Harpoons"
 Nancy Gustafson (1974) is an opera soprano.
 Junior Mance (1945) is a jazz pianist.

Science, technology, and education
 Robert Axelrod (1961), political science professor at the University of Michigan, recipient of 2012 National Medal of Science
 Matthew Cook (1988), mathematician and computer scientist who proved Stephen Wolfram's conjecture that the Rule 110 cellular automaton is Turing-complete
William E. Cross Jr. (1959)  Academic and author.
 Ann Hardy (1951), computer pioneer.
 David Keightley. (1951?) University of California Sinologist.
 Dwight H. Perkins. (1952) Harvard University economist of China.
 Jay Rosenberg (1959) Philosopher, academic.
 Sarah Whiting (1982), architect and Dean of the Harvard University Graduate School of Design
 Amie Wilkinson (1983), mathematician and professor at University of Chicago

Sports
 Alex Agase (1941) was a football guard and head coach at Northwestern and Purdue.  In 1963, he was inducted into the College Football Hall of Fame
 Lou Agase (1943) was a standout college football player and later coach, who later briefly served as head coach of the Toronto Argonauts of the Canadian Football League.
 Paddy Driscoll (1914) was a quarterback who was elected to both the Pro Football Hall of Fame and College Football Hall of Fame.  He both played for and coached the Chicago Cardinals and Chicago Bears.
 Kevin Foster (1987) was a Major League Baseball pitcher (1993–98, 2001), playing most of his career with the Chicago Cubs.
 Clint Frank was a halfback at Yale University.  He won the 1937 Heisman Trophy and was the first winner of the Maxwell Award.
 Eric Friedler (born 1954), tennis player
 Robert Gary (1991) is a 2-time Olympian (3,000 m steeplechase; 1996, 2004) and current head coach of Furman University's men's track & field  and cross country teams.  He formerly coached both sports at Ohio State University, where he competed as a collegian.
Dov Grumet-Morris (2000) was a professional ice hockey player
 William Heusner (1944) was a swimmer who competed at the 1948 Summer Olympics and won two medals at the 1951 Pan American Games.
 Damon Jones (1992) was an NFL tight end (1997–2001), playing his entire career for the Jacksonville Jaguars.
 Yonel Jourdain (1989) was a running back and kick returner for the Buffalo Bills.
 Mike Kenn (1974) was a 5-time NFL Pro Bowl offensive tackle (1978–94), playing his entire career for the Atlanta Falcons.  His uniform number 78 was retired by the Falcons.
 Bob Lackey was a two-time All-American basketball player known as the "Black Swan", at Marquette University, who played two years for the New York Nets.
 Cecil Martin (1994) was an NFL fullback (1999–2003) who played for the Philadelphia Eagles and Tampa Bay Buccaneers.
 Ed Martin, USFL player
 Emery Moorehead (1972) was an NFL tight end who played most of his career for the Chicago Bears.  He was the starting tight end for the Super Bowl XX champion Chicago Bears.
 Steve Parker, NFL player
 Dan Peterson (1954) is a professional basketball coach.  He retired after leading Olimpia Milano to the 1987 Grand Slam Champions Cup, Italian Championship and Italian Cup.  In 2011, Peterson was hired to coach his old team, Olimpia Milano, for the second half of that season after the old coach was fired.
 Jim Purnell (1960) was an NFL linebacker (1964–72), playing most of his career with the Chicago Bears.
 Richard Mason Rocca (1996) was a basketball player who played on the Italy national team and for Olimpia Milano.
 Mike Rogodzinski (1966) was a Major League Baseball outfielder for the Philadelphia Phillies (1973–75).
 Clarke Rosenberg (2011) is an American-Israeli basketball player in the Israel Basketball Premier League
 Diane Simpson-Bundy is a two-time Olympic gymnast and television broadcaster.
 Everette Stephens (1984) was an NBA guard (1988–91).
 Ray Woods (1913), brother of Ralf, was a three-time men's basketball All-American (1915–17) and one-time Helms National Player of the Year (1917) at Illinois.
 Pollyanna Johns Kimbrough (1994) was a WNBA center (1998–2004) who played for the Charlotte Sting,  Cleveland Rockers, Miami Sol, and Houston Comets.

References

Education in Evanston, Illinois